The  is a museum located in Hakusan Bunkyo, Tokyo, Japan.  It is the oldest building of the University of Tokyo, and is open to general public as the annex of The University Museum. It was formerly used as a medical school.  As collection, there are the natural history specimen collections, the animal specimen collection of Chartering foreigner teacher E Morse's immediate pupils, the art and science specimen collection of Prof. Mitake Hide, member of the engineering model of Kōbushō Kōgakuryō.  Many bronze statues of Tokyo University professors exist in this building.

Example of statues

External links
The Present and Future of the University Museum - University of Tokyo

Museums in Tokyo
University museums in Japan
University of Tokyo
Buildings and structures in Bunkyō